Megan Wing (born November 1, 1975) is a Canadian ice dancer. With partner and husband Aaron Lowe, she is a two-time Four Continents bronze medallist.

Career 
Born in Vancouver, British Columbia, Wing began skating at the age of five and took up ice dancing at age 14. She joined forces with Aaron Lowe in 1986. The duo captured six bronze medals and four silver medals at the Canadian National Championships and competed in the 2006 Winter Olympics, where they finished 11th overall. On April 25, 2006, Wing and Lowe announced officially their retirement from competitive skating.

Wing and Lowe coach in British Columbia. Their students include:
 Miku Makita / Tyler Gunara
 Haley Sales / Nikolas Wamsteeker
 Nicole Orford / Thomas Williams
 Haley Sales / Nikolas Wamsteeker
 Madeline Edwards / Zhao Kai Pang
 Noa Bruser / Timothy Lum
 Sara Aghai / Jussiville Partanen
 Tarrah Harvey/ Keith Gagnon
 Ashlynne Stairs / Lee Royer 
 Lee Ho-jung / Richard Kang-in Kam (choreography)

Personal life 
Wing / Lowe's twins, a daughter and son named Keauna Auburn Wing Lowe and Tayson Pierce Wing Lowe, were born on October 6, 2011.

Programs

Competitive highlights

GP: ISU Champions Series / Grand Prix

with Lowe

1995–1996 to 2005–2006

1989–1990 to 1994–1995

References

External links
 
 Official site
 Skate Canada profile
 Care to Ice Dance? - Wing & Lowe

1975 births
Living people
Canadian female ice dancers
Canadian people of Irish descent
Canadian people of Scottish descent
Canadian sportspeople of Chinese descent
Figure skaters at the 2006 Winter Olympics
Four Continents Figure Skating Championships medalists
Olympic figure skaters of Canada
Figure skaters from Vancouver
Sportspeople from Windsor, Ontario